Denis Marshall may refer to:

Denis Marshall (footballer) (born 1940), Australian rules footballer
Denis Marshall (politician) (born 1943), New Zealand politician

See also
Dennis Marshall (disambiguation)
Dennis Marschall (born 1996), German racing driver